Chabbie Caine Charlery (born 6 March 1983) is a Saint Lucian-born cricketer who plays for the Turks and Caicos Islands.  Charlery is a left-handed batsman who bowls left-arm fast-medium.

Charlery played a single Twenty20 match for the Turks and Caicos Islands against Montserrat in the 2008 Stanford 20/20 at the Stanford Cricket Ground.  He was dismissed for 6 runs in this match by McPherson Meade, with the Turks and Caicos Islands making just 67 runs in their twenty overs.  Montserrat went on to win the match by 9 wickets.

References

External links
Chabbie Charlery at ESPNcricinfo
Chabbie Charlery at CricketArchive

1983 births
Living people
Saint Lucian emigrants to the Turks and Caicos Islands
Turks and Caicos Islands cricketers